Borealis (Latin for northern or of the north) may refer to:

Astronomy
 Borealis Basin or North Polar Basin, a basin on the planet Mars
 Borealis quadrangle, an area on the planet Mercury
 Borealis Planitia, a basin within the quadrangle

Commerce 
 Borealis AG, an international company based in Vienna, Austria, which produces polyethylene and polypropylene
 Borealis Alliance, an alliance among the north-west European Air Navigation Service Providers
 Borealis Exploration Limited, a Gibraltar-based research and development company
 Borealis, a configuration of the Canadian NAACO Brigadier pistol
 MS Borealis, a cruise ship from Fred. Olsen Cruise Lines
 OMERS Infrastructure, formerly Borealis Infrastructure, an investment division of OMERS (Ontario Municipal Employees Retirement System)

Media 
 Borealis (band), a power metal band from Ontario, Canada
 Borealis (festival), a Norwegian music festival
 Borealis (2008 film), a documentary film directed by Frank Wolf
 Borealis (2013 film) (a/k/a Survival Code), a science fiction television film directed by David Frazee
 Borealis (2015 film), a comedy-drama film directed by Sean Garrity
 Borealis (2020 film), a documentary film directed by Kevin McMahon
 Borealis Records, a Canadian record label
 Borealis, a fictional ship in the Half-Life and Portal video game series
 Borealis (song), from the 2019 studio album Good Faith by French music producer Madeon

See also 
 Aurora Borealis (disambiguation)
 Boreal (disambiguation)